Françoise Mailliard (18 December 1929 – 7 June 2017) was a French fencer. She competed in the women's team foil event at the 1960 Summer Olympics.

References

External links
 

1929 births
2017 deaths
Sportspeople from Orléans
French female foil fencers
Olympic fencers of France
Fencers at the 1960 Summer Olympics